The 2023 Nasarawa State gubernatorial election will take place on 18 March 2023, to elect the Governor of Nasarawa State, concurrent with elections to the Nasarawa State House of Assembly as well as twenty-seven other gubernatorial elections and elections to all other state houses of assembly. The election—which was postponed from its original 11 March date—will be held three weeks after the presidential election and National Assembly elections. Incumbent APC Governor Abdullahi Sule is eligible to run for re-election and has been renominated by his party.

The primaries, scheduled for between 4 April and 9 June 2022, resulted in Sule being renominated by the All Progressives Congress by a wide margin on 26 May while the Peoples Democratic Party nominated former House of Representatives member David Ombugadu on 25 May.

Electoral system
The Governor of Nasarawa State is elected using a modified two-round system. To be elected in the first round, a candidate must receive the plurality of the vote and over 25% of the vote in at least two-thirds of state local government areas. If no candidate passes this threshold, a second round will be held between the top candidate and the next candidate to have received a plurality of votes in the highest number of local government areas.

Background
Nasarawa State is a large state in the North Central with vast natural areas and a improving health sector but facing underdeveloped agriculture and intense challenges in security as the nationwide kidnapping epidemic, inter-ethnic violence, and herder–farmer clashes have all heavily affected the state. Politically, the state's 2019 elections had a significant swing towards the state APC. In federal elections, Buhari gained the state for the APC while the APC swept all senate seats by gaining two PDP-held seats. Similarly, the APC gained one PDP-held House of Representatives seat, held the governorship, and kept the majority in the House of Assembly.

Ahead of his term, Sule pledged to complete the previous administration's projects, further rural electrification, and rehabilitate transportation infrastructure. In terms of his performance, Sule was praised for providing financial autonomy to local government areas but criticized for failing to follow through on promises.

Primary elections
The primaries, along with any potential challenges to primary results, were to take place between 4 April and 3 June 2022 but the deadline was extended to 9 June. The primaries, along with any potential challenges to primary results, were to take place between 4 April and 3 June 2022 but the deadline was extended to 9 June.

All Progressives Congress 
In the years before the primary, the state APC underwent a small-scale dispute between two senators that used to be governor: Abdullahi Adamu and Umaru Tanko Al-Makura while Sule and Senator Godiya Akwashiki mostly stood on the sidelines but leaned towards Al-Makura. The disagreement intensified into a subtle cold war when Adamu resigned from the Senate to become APC National Chairman in March 2022 and gained extensive power over the party at-large leading to rumours that he was planning on replacing Al-Makura and Akwashiki with closer allies. If the wrangling escalated, analysts said it had the potential to impact party unity and thus the ability for effective campaigning in the general election.

On the primary date, Sule defeated his sole opponent—Fatima Hussain Abdullahi—winning the nomination near-unanimously. In his acceptance speech, Sule thanked the delegates and Abdullahi for contesting; Abdullahi congratulated Sule and pledged her support for his general election campaign. A few weeks after the primary, Sule formed a party reconciliation committee as, despite the straightforward gubernatorial primary, the party divided over accusations that Adamu manipulated delegate lists for two senate primaries including the successful primary challenge to Akwashiki.

Nominated 
 Abdullahi Sule: Governor (2019–present)
 Running mate—Emmanuel Agbadu Akabe: Deputy Governor (2019–present)

Eliminated in primary 
 Fatima Hussain Abdullahi: ex-wife of former Governor and APC National Chairman Abdullahi Adamu

Results

People's Democratic Party 
Analysts viewed the PDP gubernatorial primary as a contest between two major internal party groupings, the group led by former senator Solomon Ewuga and another group led by state party chairman Francis Orogu. In April 2022, the Ewuga-led group met in Abuja with the goal of consolidating behind one candidate and reportedly settled on attempting to coax former minister Labaran Maku into the party to back his candidacy; later that month, Maku did rejoin the PDP after eight years in APGA. Around the same time, the Orogu-led bloc also held a meeting to line up behind a single candidate with some sources stating that retired army general Nuhu Angbazo may have emerged as the bloc's candidate. To ensure party unity, Orogu held a meeting on 25 April with Maku, Angbazo, and David Ombugadu (the other candidate) where all three committed to working together to unseat Sule irrespective of the primary winner.

Early on the day of the primary, Maku suddenly withdrew from the election without a stated reason or grievance. When the primary held later that day, Ombugadu defeated Angbazo by about 10% of the delegates' votes. While Ombugadu promised to lead the party to victory, Angbazo accepted the results and affirmed the previous arrangement to work to support the party nominee. In June, Ombugadu's running mate was announced as Yahaya Usman-Ohinoyi—former House of Assembly member—at a meeting with PDP State Working Committee members in Lafia.

Nominated 
 David Ombugadu: former House of Representatives member for Akwanga/Nasarawa Eggon/Wamba (2011–2019) and 2019 PDP gubernatorial nominee
 Running mate—Yahaya Usman-Ohinoyi: former House of Assembly member

Eliminated in primary 
 Nuhu Angbazo: former Army major general and son of Aren Eggon Bala Abaine Angbazo

Withdrew 
 Labaran Maku: National Secretary of the All Progressives Grand Alliance (2015–2022), 2015 and 2019 APGA gubernatorial nominee, former Minister of Information (2010–2014), and former Deputy Governor (2003–2007)

Declined 
 Suleiman Adokwe: former Senator for Nasarawa South (2007–2019) and former Commissioner for Information and Internal Affairs (2003–2006)
 Yusuf Agabi: 2015 PDP gubernatorial nominee
 Solomon Ewuga: 2019 PDP gubernatorial candidate, former Senator for Nasarawa North (2012–2015), former Minister of State for the Federal Capital Territory (1999–2001), and former Deputy Governor (1999)

Results

Minor parties 

 Inusa Mohammed Anga (Accord)
Running mate: Murtala Aliyu
 Samuel Manga (Action Alliance)
Running mate: Lantana Mohammed Ozegya
 Patricia Danlami Tsakpa (Action Democratic Party)
Running mate: Adamu Sidi Bakyano
 Alaku Godwin William (African Democratic Congress)
Running mate: Rufaidah Talatu Osede
 Mohammed Suleiman Awwal (Allied Peoples Movement)
Running mate: Obile Augustine Otso
 Matthew Avre Ombugaku (All Progressives Grand Alliance)
Running mate: Baba Dauda Sarki
 Joseph Ewuga (Labour Party)
Running mate: Ibrahim Suleiman
 Abdullahi Yakubu Maidoya (New Nigeria Peoples Party)
Running mate: Adams Gwamna Nyisana
 Abubakar Sambo Musa (National Rescue Movement)
Running mate: Kyauta Atnadu Bawa
 Yusuf Musa Nagogo (People's Redemption Party)
Running mate: Okara Mathew Godiya
 Mohammed Alfa Mustapha (Social Democratic Party)
Running mate: Alex Ogah Ewolo Kana
 Umaru Aliyu Doma (Zenith Labour Party)
Running mate: Monday Sunday Abimiku

Campaign
After the primaries, analysts noted the main change from the previous two gubernatorial elections: Labaran Maku not running as the APGA nominee. Maku, who obtained 29.4% in 2015 and 19.8% in 2019, left APGA in April 2022 and rejoined the PDP leading a report to say Sule may "face an uphill task [in] defeating the combined forces in [the] PDP." Further issues emerged for Sule due to the APC presidential ticket—APC nominee Bola Tinubu's selection of Kashim Shettima created a Muslim-Muslim ticket, violating an unwritten convention against same religion tickets—with pundits noting the religious diversity of Nasarawa and the opposition forming against the APC among northern Christians. The presidential ticket fomented enough internal dissent among Sule administration officials that Sule reportedly issued an ultimatum to his appointees, telling them to remain loyal to the APC or resign from their offices. To compound the internal APC dissent complication, Sule continued to face issues from the state APC leadership dispute and members aggrieved by various primary outcomes. For his part, Sule and the APC campaigned on milestones from his term with a focus on newly constructed and rehabilitated roads, upgraded health infrastructure, and the timely payment of civil servant salaries. By August, analysts continued to focus on APC infighting and its potential impact on Sule's campaign but also noted splits within oppositional candidates and their parties. The next month, pundits reiterated the potential impact of defections from the APC but also noted PDP strength in Eggon and Alago ethnicities.

Throughout the campaign, pundits focused on Nasarawa's competitiveness on the presidential level as the state's margin was about 36,000 votes in 2015 when it was won by Goodluck Jonathan (PDP) and only around 6,000 votes in 2019 when Muhammadu Buhari (APC) won it. This focus lead to intense attention on the statewide results in the 2023 presidential election; Peter Obi (LP) won the state with 35% of the vote, beating Bola Tinubu (APC) at 33% and Atiku Abubakar (PDP) at 27%. The result, along with APC senatorial defeats to the PDP and SDP, led observers to question Sule's chances in the gubernatorial election amid the losses and APC crisis. Considering that LP gubernatorial nominee Joseph Ewuga stepped down for Ombugadu on 9 March, analysts noted Ombugadu's rise and further breakdowns in intra-APC relationship.

Conduct

Electoral timetable

General election

Results

By senatorial district 
The results of the election by senatorial district.

By federal constituency
The results of the election by federal constituency.

By local government area 
The results of the election by local government area.

See also 
 2023 Nigerian elections
 2023 Nigerian gubernatorial elections

Notes

References 

Nasarawa State gubernatorial election
2023
2023 Nasarawa State elections
Nasarawa